Media.net is a contextual advertising network. On August 21, 2016, Miteno Communication Technology (also known as Shuzhi.AI), a Chinese consortium acquired Media.net for 900 million USD. The deal is said to be the third largest ad tech acquisition ever.

By revenue, Media.net is the second-largest contextual advertising network in the world. It is also one of the top 5 largest ad tech companies worldwide by market cap. The company has over 1300 employees across North America, Asia and Europe. It has its HQ in New York and its global HQ in Dubai.

Media.net is often referenced  when talking about ad networks, like Google AdSense.  They have ads that are mostly for blogs or text websites, because of the contextual element.  If you write a web page about the best computers, it will give ads for computers.  Their ads look like a list of links, or buttons that link to another website.  Publishers get paid every time someone on their website clicks on one of their ads. They run programmatic ads based on the user's online behavior and building algorithms that enable a more efficient way of targeting the right consumers.

History 
Media.net was founded by Divyank Turakhia.

References

Online advertising
Online advertising services and affiliate networks
Contextual advertising
Advertising tools
Companies based in Dubai
Companies with year of establishment missing